Schönberg-Lachtal is a former municipality in the district of Murau in the Austrian state of Styria. Since the 2015 Styria municipal structural reform, it is part of the municipality Oberwölz.

Geography
The municipality lies about 16 km northeast of Murau in the Wölz Tauern.

References

Rottenmann and Wölz Tauern
Cities and towns in Murau District